Baron Ferenc Hatvany  (29 October 1881 – 7 February 1958) was a Hungarian painter and art collector. His collection included paintings by Tintoretto, Cézanne, Renoir, Ingres and Courbet, most notably L'Origine du monde and  Femme nue couchée.

During the Second World War, his art collection was placed in a bank vault in Budapest to protect it from the pro-Nazi Hungarian government, and the Hatvany family, which was Jewish, fled the country just before the Nazi takeover of Hungary in March 1944.

Mystery surrounds the fate of the paintings, which appear to have been looted by Germans and then by Soviets. Towards the end of the Second World War his paintings were looted by Soviet troops but some were ransomed by Hatvany. In 1947 he emigrated to Paris. In 1955 L'Origine du monde was sold at auction for 1.5 million francs (the buyer was psychoanalyst Jacques Lacan). The lawyer Hans Deutsch filed a claim on behalf of Ferenc Hatvany against the German government and obtained compensation for him.

Paintings that were looted from Hatvany's collection are still hanging on museum walls in Budapest, Moscow, and Nizhny Novgorod. John Constable's Beaching A Boat, Brighton was identified in the collection of The Tate in 2014.

Hatvany died in Lausanne in 1958.

References

Further reading
 László Mravik. Hungary's Pillaged Art Heritage. Part Two: The Fate of the Hatvany Collection. Hungarian Quarterly vol. 39, no. 15, 1998. . Accessed on February 7, 2007.
 László Mravik. "Princes, Counts, Idlers and Bourgeois:" A Hundred Years of Hungarian Collecting, 3rd part. In T. Kieselbach (ed.) Studies in Modern Hungarian Painting 1892–1919. . Accessed on February 7, 2007.

External links

 A short biography of Ferenc Hatvany

1881 births
1958 deaths
Hungarian art collectors
Hungarian Jews
Subjects of Nazi art appropriations
Artists from Budapest
Jewish art collectors
20th-century Hungarian painters
Barons of Austria
Ferenc
Hungarian male painters
20th-century Hungarian male artists